The Strongest-K Tag Team Championship is a tag team championship in the Japanese professional wrestling promotion, Kaientai Dojo. It has existed since 2005, and it is currently inactive.

Reigns
There are a total of 41 reigns and 3 vacancies, shared between 32 different teams consisting of 29 distinctive champions. The last champions were Kaji Tomato and Taishi Takizawa before the titles were deactivated.

Title history

Combined reigns 

{| class="wikitable sortable" style="text-align: center"
!Rank
!Team
!No. ofreigns
!Combineddays
|-
!1
| Omega || 3 || 486
|-
!2
| Hiroki and Kengo Mashimo || 1 || 420
|-
!3
| Handsome || 2 || 355
|-
!4
| Kazma and Kengo Mashimo || 1 || 344
|-
!5
| Kaji Tomato and Taishi Takizawa || 3 || 298
|-
!6
| Hiroki/Hi69 and Yuji Hino || 1 || 287
|-
!7
| Handsome Joe and Yasu Urano || 1 || 277
|-
!8
| Magatsuki || 1 || 224
|-
!9
| SFU || 1 || 210
|-
!10
| Sekitoba || 1 || 203
|-
!11
| Omega || 3 || 194
|-
!12
| Kengo Mashimo and Ryuichi Sekine || 1 || 189
|-
!13
| Magatsuki || 1 || 161
|-
!14
| Kengo Mashimo and Taka Michinoku || 1 || 124
|-
!15
| Little Galaxy || 1 || 119
|-
!16
| NEX4 || 1 || 112
|-
!17
| Tank Nagai and Ayato Yoshida || 1 || 106
|-
!18
| Monster Plant || 1 || 100
|-
!rowspan=2|19
| Magatsuki || 1 || 98
|-
| Moonlight Express || 1 || 98
|-
!20
| Daigoro Kashiwa and Ricky Fuji || 1 || 92
|-
!21
| Miyawaki and Yoshiya || 1 || 83
|-
!22
| Hiroshi Fukuda and Shiori Asahi || 1 || 71
|-
!23
| Ryuichi Sekine and Saburo Inematsu || 1 || 68
|-
!rowspan=2|24
| Magatsuki || 1 || 56
|-
| Men's Teioh and Taka Michinoku || 1 || 56
|-
!26
| Kazma Sakamoto and Kengo Mashimo || 1 || 55
|-
!27
| Shiori Asahi and Makoto Oishi || 1 || 54
|-
!28
| Dinosaur Takuma and Kotaro Yoshino || 1 || 50
|-
!29
| Kaji Tomato and Taka Michinoku || 2 || 41
|-
!30
| Kazma and Ryota Chikuzen || 1 || 33
|-
!31
| Kengo Mashimo and Madoka || 1 || 29
|-
!32
| Little Galaxy || 1 || 18
|-

By wrestler 
{|class="wikitable sortable" style="text-align: center"
!Rank
!Wrestler
!data-sort-type="number"|No. ofreigns
!data-sort-type="number"|Combineddays	
|-
!1
| Kengo Mashimo || 9 || 1,583
|-
!2
| Shiori Asahi || 6 || 886
|-
!3
| Hiroki/Hi69 || 2 || 707
|-
!4
| Handsome Joe || 3 || 632
|-
!5
| Taka Michinoku || 6 || 576
|-
!6
| Kaji Tomato || 6 || 549
|-
!7
| Taishi Takizawa || 4 || 501
|-
!8
| Makoto Oishi || 3 || 486
|-
!9
| Kazma/Kazma Sakamoto || 4 || 482
|-
!10
| Yuji Hino || 4 || 481
|-
!11
| Tank Nagai || 3 || 323
|-
!12
| Yasu Urano || 1 || 277
|-
!13
| Ryuichi Sekine || 2 || 257
|-
!14
| Yuki Sato || 2 || 242
|-
!15
| Ayato Yoshida || 2 || 218
|-
!16
| Saburo Inematsu || 3 || 194
|-
!17
| Daigoro Kashiwa || 2 || 192
|-
!18
| Miyawaki || 2 || 133
|-
!19
| Kyu Mogami || 1 || 112
|-
!rowspan=3|20
| Kunio Toshima || 1 || 98
|-
| Mao || 1 || 98
|-
| Mike Bailey || 1 || 98
|-
!23
| Ricky Fuji || 1 || 92
|-
!24
| Yoshiya || 1 || 83
|-
!25
| Hiroshi Fukuda || 1 || 71
|-
!26
| Men's Teioh || 1 || 56
|-
!27
| Dinosaur Takuma || 1 || 50
|-
!28
| Ryota Chikuzen || 1 || 33
|-
!29
| Madoka || 1 || 29
|-

References

Active Advance Pro Wrestling championships
Tag team wrestling championships